Jajinci railway station is a railway station of Belgrade railway junction and Belgrade–Požarevac railway. Located in northern part of Resnik, Rakovica, Belgrade. Railroad continues to Beli Potok in one, in the other direction to Rakovica, in third direction to Belgrade marshalling yard "A" and in the fourth direction towards to Ostružnica. Jajinci railway station consists of 4 railway tracks.

See also 
 Serbian Railways

References 

Railway stations in Belgrade
Rakovica, Belgrade